Woodkirk Academy (formerly Woodkirk High School) is an academy located in Tingley, West Yorkshire, England. Established in 1948, the school now has over 1,800 pupils on roll, over 300 sixth form students and over 250 members of staff. Following Woodkirk gaining ‘Specialist Science Status', the school was briefly renamed Woodkirk High Specialist Science School from 2003 to 2011.

The current Principal is Mr Tim Jones, who replaced Ms Jo Barton in 2021. Prior to Barton, Jonathan White held the position for over 10 years. White succeeded previous Head Teacher Bill Bailey in 2005. Assistant Head was held continuously for nearly 20 years by Mrs Joyce Ford, until her death in early 2019.

History 

Woodkirk opened to students as Woodkirk Secondary School in September 1948.

It consists of the main hall, administration quarters, a number of small classrooms, gymnasium and the central Tower Block which housed the schools main departments: Mathematics, English, Science and Humanities.

The school is set out into blocks. These blocks consisted of White block, Blue block, Red block, Green block and Yellow block. White block consisted of the art and computing classrooms. Blue block was home to many offices, PSA, toilets, main hall and the music classrooms. It also has a single DT room for woodwork. In Green block is multiple English and PSHRE classrooms also the "LRC" or "Learning Resources Centre". The yellow block has the maths, language, sociology, and child development classrooms as well as the teaching lounge and a couple more offices.

By 1972 the school was expanding and saw the addition of the newly built ROSLA Block which accommodated the new 5t-h year students, in line with the raising of school leaving age (the meaning of ROSLA). Home economics, textiles and woodwork were also taught here.

In the early 1980s, the school's Yellow Block was completed to house the new English and Science departments on the lower two floors. Laboratories were separated to teach biology, chemistry, physics and astronomy. The upper floors houses the relocated Maths and newly formed Modern Foreign Languages (MFL) departments.

In the 1990s a new sports hall was built to accommodate the growing number of students. This was followed by an "All-Weather" pitch for outdoor sports and later a 3G synthetic grass football pitch complete with new goalposts, fencing and flood-lit pitches.

In early 2003 the school gained "Specialist Science" status. Following this, the school was renamed Woodkirk High Specialist Science School and the school logo was adapted to include an atom and the Pi (π) symbol.

In mid 2003, Woodkirk completed its Green Block, housing increased English and religious studies classrooms, a social area for years 10 and 11, a new Learning Resource Centre and Library and the new Woollin Hall, named after previous school Chairman of Governors, Jeff Woollin. In November 2006 the main hall was refurbished and tiered seating was installed to be used for annual shows and assemblies.

In March 2007 the schools original administration building was demolished and a new data and administration suite was built to include separate entrances for pupils and visitors and extra space for office staff. In July 2008 an external shelter was built for outdoor dining. Early 2010 saw the conversion of the school minibus garages into a space used by Sixth Formers; it was used for meetings with the Labour Party representative of Morley and Outwood, Ed Balls, during the 2010 General and Local Elections. New areas were also constructed for Year 10 and 11 BTEC students.

In September 2011 the school officially became an academy, joining Leodis Academies Trust and with a name change to Woodkirk Academy.

In the 2010s the new academy saw the replacement of its original tower-chimney. This had long been a landmark for the school but no longer fit with regulations, so was replaced with a more energy and fuel-efficient system.

Throughout the 2010s the original and older school buildings were gradually refurbished and fitted with new windows and grey facade replacing the schools former blue and yellow panelling. Part of the former ROSLA block was converted into the Dennis Fisher Sixth Form Centre and divided into three rooms, the canteen, common room, and computer room. The lower floors house the five refurbished design technology classrooms.

In September 2018, Woodkirk celebrated 70 years since its original opening.

School shows 

Each year since the early 1960s the school has staged a public production. Past shows include: Joseph and the Amazing Technicolor Dreamcoat, Back  to the 80s, Les Miserables, Fame, Grease, Little Shop of Horrors and The Sound of Music. In 1999, following the March production, the cast  of Grease travelled to the London Palladium to represent the North-East as part of an afternoon performance celebrating the 100th anniversary of N.O.D.A. The cast performed a 10-minute excerpt of Myth!, written by a pupil and a school teacher.

In 2007 the school sixth form produced a show called "Summer Nights", written by students, which included songs from Wicked, Phantom Of The Opera, Grease, Side Show and The Last Five Years.

The 2008 school show was Chess, performed solely by students. Unlike previous years a 'Gala Night' was organised by the Business and Enterprise group for specially invited guests and staff. In March 2009 the school put on Seussical as the annual school show. This show celebrated the works of Dr. Seuss, famous for his creation of the "Grinch" and "Green Eggs and Ham". The 2010 production was Hairspray. Woodkirk was the first school to perform the musical, the amateur license having just been released. The 2011 production was the musical We Will Rock You, a tribute to Queen, and in March 2012, Beauty and the Beast. More recent performances have included The Phantom of the Opera (2013), Starlight Express (2014), The Addams Family (2015) and Ghost (2016) with three of them being officially reviewed by the Organisation NODA with great praise.

The music department also organises performances at venues such as Woodkirk Church and Morley Town Hall.

 Sixth Form at Woodkirk 
Woodkirk Academy has a large sixth form with courses for study at AS and A2 level, including some subjects unavailable at GCSE level, such as Psychology. The sixth form previously had limited space for study and shared many classrooms with the rest of the school. Exclusive sixth form areas were created to include work rooms, two new common rooms and the conversion of the former ROSLA block into the Dennis Fisher Sixth Form Centre. 

The Sixth Form at Woodkirk Academy has a separate, dedicated website, at http://woodkirksixthform.co.uk/.

School uniform
Currently the school uniform includes a royal blue jumper with a yellow-banded collar, with a different coloured collar, depending on the year group. The current lower school colours are: white, light blue, green, red and black   (from years 7 to 11). Sixth form years 12 and 13 wear black, white or grey clothing. Sixth form dress code states that students must wear clothes that are gray and/or black and/or white. No large images or text are allowed on sixth form students' clothing, and they must wear an identity badge at all times.

 Notable alumni  
David Batty, former professional football player for Leeds United.
Stevie Ward, professional rugby league player for Leeds Rhinos and founder of Mantality'' magazine.

References

External links 
School Website
Woodkirk Academy, Academy conversion information letter. Ofsted
DFES statistics for Woodkirk High Specialist Science School, (archive)

Academies in Leeds
Secondary schools in Leeds
Educational institutions established in 1948
1948 establishments in England